Title in Limbo is an album by The Residents in collaboration with Renaldo and the Loaf, released in 1983 on Ralph Records. Guest performers include Snakefinger (guitar and violin), and vocalist Nessie Lessons.

The album was originally recorded during four days in 1981, when Renaldo and The Loaf were on vacation in San Francisco, but they were unable to finish the album before the duo went home. In 1983, during a time of financial crisis in the Residents' quarters, the half-finished album, with its gentle, tuneful sound, seemed like a financial lifeline, so the Residents decided to put vocals on the tracks and ready the album for release. Dave "The Loaf" Janssen was unable to get time off from work and just sent some tapeloops. Brian Poole ("Renaldo M.") came to San Francisco to sing, and also participated in the instrumental overdubs.

"Monkey and Bunny" from the album was performed live during The Residents' 13th Anniversary Tour; additionally, "The Shoe Salesman" was included in the setlist of the group's 2002 Demons Dance Alone tour.

The original release was on vinyl.  During the late 1980s some of the songs were released on compilation CDs or as CD bonus tracks on the first CD issue of Not Available, and the full album was reissued as a limited-edition CD in 1998.

Track listing

2017 CD reissue 
The album was reissued by Klanggalerie in 2017 as a deluxe edition containing a second disc titled 4 Daze – the original 1981 demo that served as the basis for Title in Limbo.

Personnel 

 The Residents – performance
 Brian Poole – performance
 Dave Janssen – performance
 Snakefinger – guitar on "Sitting on the Sand" and "Extra: Version", violin on "Africa Tree"
 Nessie Lessons – vocals on "Crashing"

1983 albums
Ralph Records albums
The Residents albums